Richard Koeper was a professional American football player.

Biography
Koeper was born Richard Manfred Koeper on July 23, 1943 in San Francisco, California. He died from a heart attack on March 13, 2010.

Career
Koeper played the 1966 NFL season with the Atlanta Falcons. He had previously been drafted by the Green Bay Packers in the sixth round of the 1965 NFL Draft. Later, he would play with the BC Lions of the Canadian Football League.

Koeper also served as an assistant coach at Oregon State University, where he had played at the collegiate level.

References

Atlanta Falcons players
BC Lions players
Oregon State Beavers football players
Oregon State Beavers football coaches
1943 births
2010 deaths
Players of American football from San Francisco